Jonathan "Jay" Wheeldon (born 28 August 1988) is an English football coach and former player who serves as head coach of Calgary Foothills.

Career

Early career
After spending many of his youth years with English academies Exeter City and Plymouth Argyle, Wheeldon signed his first professional contract with Torquay United in League Two. Wheeldon would go on to spend some time in Belgium with Montegnée before returning home to play for non-league club Hungerford Town.

Calgary Foothills
From 2015 to 2018 Wheeldon played under his brother, Tommy Wheeldon Jr. with Calgary Foothills. In 2018 the club captured the PDL Championship.

Cavalry FC
Wheeldon signed with Cavalry FC on 13 March 2019. He made his debut in their inaugural game against York9 on 4 May. Wheeldon went on to set an 18 match unbeaten streak in the first season which was the record for any player across the division. Wheeldon re-signed with Cavalry for the 2020 season on 29 January 2020. On 26 January 2021, Cavalry announced that Wheeldon had left the club in order to pursue a career in coaching.

Coaching career
Wheeldon began coaching in Calgary in 2012 with PASS Academy while also serving as technical director of Calgary Northside SC. In 2013, Wheeldon became manager of the Calgary Foothills Skills Academy, a role he retained after returning to professional football in 2019. By 2021, Wheeldon had completed his Canada Soccer A License, and had previously obtained a UEFA B License and is currently the Academy Director with Calgary Foothills along with becoming head coach of the Calgary Foothills U23 team in June 2021

Honours 
Calgary Foothills
PDL Championship: 2018

Cavalry FC 
 Canadian Premier League Finals 
Runners-up: 2019
Canadian Premier League (Regular season): 
Champions: Spring 2019, Fall 2019

Personal life
Wheeldon is a lifelong supporter of Everton FC.

References

External links

Living people
1988 births
Association football defenders
English footballers
Footballers from Plymouth, Devon
English expatriate footballers
Expatriate footballers in Belgium
English expatriate sportspeople in Belgium
Expatriate soccer players in Canada
English expatriate sportspeople in Canada
Torquay United F.C. players
R.R.F.C. Montegnée players
Hungerford Town F.C. players
Calgary Foothills FC players
Cavalry FC players
National League (English football) players
Belgian Third Division players
USL League Two players
Canadian Premier League players